Sean Woods (born 2 July 1965) is a horse trainer. He trained successfully in England before decamping to Hong Kong in 2002/03, and has enjoyed consistent success since. He trained 18 winners in 2010/11; overall, he totaled 392 winners.

Performance

References
The Hong Kong Jockey Club – Trainer Information
The Hong Kong Jockey Club 

Hong Kong horse trainers
Living people
1965 births